Água Viva may refer to:

 Água Viva (album), a 1978 album by Gal Costa
 Água Viva (TV series), a 1980 Brazilian telenovela
 Água Viva (novel), a novel by Clarice Lispector